Uzungeçit is a town (belde)  in the Uludere District of Şırnak Province in Turkey. The settlement is populated by Kurds of the Goyan tribe and had a population of 5,010 in 2021.

References 

Populated places in Şırnak Province
Towns in Turkey
Kurdish settlements in Şırnak Province